Jacob Abbot Cummings (1773–1820) was a bookseller, publisher, schoolteacher and author in Boston, Massachusetts, in the early 19th-century.

Biography

Born in Hollis, New Hampshire, to Ebenezer Cummings and Elizabeth Abbot, Jacob attended Harvard University (class of 1801). In 1809 he married Elizabeth Merrill; their children were James Merrill (b. 1810) and John S. (1812–1813).

As a bookseller and publisher, his business partners included William Andrews (Andrews & Cummings, 1807–1809) and William Hilliard (Cummings & Hilliard, 1812–1820)

Cummings "kept a school for both girls and boys" in Boston. He "seems to have been ahead of his time in both the style and content of his teaching. ... He wrote a textbook, An Introduction to Ancient and Modern Geography, giving something of his pedagogical philosophy in the preface. 'It will not be profitable to confine the young mind long to any one part of the earth. ... No small injury is frequently done to young persons, by attempting to make them perfect in what they the first time commit to memory, especially if it be somewhat difficult.'" He also liked the bible "as a reading text because of its simple dialogue, short sentences, frequent transitions, and interesting narrative. He wrote that the children kept 'hoping on every perusal that scenes of sorrow and death may be reversed and the innocent sufferer escape.'"

After his death in 1820, Cummings' "private library" was auctioned at the office of Blake & Cunningham on Kilby Street in Boston.

See also
 List of booksellers in Boston

References

Further reading

Works by Cummings
 The New Testament of our Lord and Saviour Jesus Christ: with an introduction giving an account of Jewish and other sects : with notes illustrating obscure passages and explaining obsolete words and phrases : for the use of schools, academies, and private families. Boston: Published and sold by Cummings and Hilliard, 1814. 
 An introduction to ancient and modern geography: on the plan of Goldsmith and Guy; comprising rules for projecting maps, with an atlas. Boston: Cummings and Hilliard, 1814. 3rd ed. (1815); 8th ed. (1821)
 Questions on the historical parts of the New Testament : for Sunday exercises in families and schools, with four maps of the countries through which Our Saviour and his Apostles travelled. Boston : Cummings & Hilliard, 1817.
 First lessons in geography and astronomy : with seven plain maps and a view of the solar system, for the use of young children, as preparatory to ancient and modern geography. Boston : Cummings and Hilliard, 1818.
 The pronouncing spelling book: adapted to Walkers Critical pronouncing dictionary, in which the precise sound of every syllable is accurately conveyed in a manner perfectly intelligible to every capacity, by placing over such letters as lose their sounds, those letters whose sounds they receive. Boston. Cummings, Hilliard, & Co., 1821. 4th ed. (1823)

Images

1773 births
1820 deaths
People from Hollis, New Hampshire
Writers from Boston
19th century in Boston
American booksellers
American textbook writers
American male non-fiction writers
Schoolteachers from Massachusetts
American publishers (people)
Harvard University alumni